The Prescriber's Digital Reference (PDR) is a compilation of manufacturers' prescribing information (package insert) on prescription drugs, updated regularly and published by ConnectiveRx.

History
The original PDR was titled "Physician's Desk Reference" but was renamed because not all prescribers are physicians and the reference is no longer a hardback book stored on a desk. While designed to provide physicians with the full legally mandated information relevant to writing prescriptions (just as its name suggests), it is widely available in libraries and bookstores, widely used by other medical specialists, and sometimes valuable to the layman. The compilation is financially supported in part by pharmaceutical manufacturing corporations which create drugs listed within its pages. The 71st Edition, published in 2017, was the final hardcover edition.

Since then, the PDR has been available online (PDR.net) for free, and has been integrated into some electronic health record (EHR) systems. PDR.net also links to a free mobile app.

The Physicians' Desk Reference was first published in 1947 by Medical Economics Inc., a magazine publisher founded by Lansing Chapman. Medical Economics Inc. merged with Reinhold Publishing in 1966 to form Chapman-Reinhold. Litton Industries, who owned the American Book Company, acquired Chapman-Reinhold in 1968. Litton sold its publishing business to the International Thomson Organization (ITO) in 1981.

Since the late 20th century, a consumer edition has been offered at a much reduced price. Electronic editions are available on CD-ROM and the World Wide Web to subscribers. In 1984, Paul C. Kranz and Michael Grondin travelled to Oradell, New Jersey, and presented to Medical Economics (then-publisher of the PDR) a prototype developed by Grondin on a TI 99/4A computer of how a digital copy of the PDR would work and benefit clinicians. The idea originally conceived by Kranz was well received by the president and vice-president of IT and an agreement was struck to investigate. The result was the PDR on CD-ROM.  The main edition is usable by determined laypeople in conjunction with a medical dictionary.

ITO successor Thomson Reuters sold the Physicians' Desk Reference to Lee Equity Partners in 2009; Lee formed the new parent company PDR Network. Lee sold PDR Network to Genstar Capital in 2015. Genstar merged PDR Network into the new company ConnectiveRx.

About the PDR
The PDR material contained includes:

Comprehensive indexing (four sections)
by Manufacturer
Products (by company's or trademarked drug name)
Category index (for example, "antibiotics")
Generic/chemical index (non-trademark common drug names)
Color images of medications
Product information, consistent with FDA labeling
Chemical information
Function/action
Indications & Contraindications
Trial research, side effects, warnings

Related references
The PDR has several versions and related volumes:
 PDR
 PDR for Nonprescription Drugs, Dietary Supplements, and Herbs
 PDR Drug Interactions and Side Effects Index
 PDRhealth—Version in lay terms.
 PDR Family Guide to Over-the-Counter Drugs—Lay term guide to non-prescription medication.
 PDR for Ophthalmic Medicines
 PDR Drug Guide for Mental Health Professionals
 PDR for Herbal Medicines

References

External links
 PDR – Physicians' Desk Reference—Facebook

Online version 
PDR.Net—online version, free consumer drug and medical information site.

Medical manuals
Thomson Reuters
Pharmacology literature